Pasan Ko ang Daigdig (International title: World on My Shoulders / ) is a Philippine television drama series broadcast by GMA Network. Based on a 1987 Philippine film of the same title, the series is the fourth instalment of Sine Novela. Directed by Joel Lamangan, it stars Yasmien Kurdi, JC de Vera and Gina Alajar. It premiered on September 10, 2007 on the network's Dramarama sa Hapon line up replacing Pati Ba Pintig ng Puso. The series concluded on January 11, 2008 with a total of 89 episodes.

Cast and characters

Lead cast
 JC de Vera as Carding
 Yasmien Kurdi as Lupe Velez
 Gina Alajar as Metring Velez

Supporting cast
 Gary Estrada as Kadyo
 Alessandra De Rossi as Luming
 Polo Ravales as Tony
 Maureen Larrazabal as Bunny
 Mart Escudero as Isko
 Jennica Garcia as Janet
 Marcus Madrigal as Griego
 Karen delos Reyes as Sosima
 Jenine Desederio as Ruffy
 Racquel Vilavicencio as Veron
 Tony Mabesa as Ben
 Jim Pebangco as Herman
 Nonie Buencamino as Efren
 Sweet Ramos as Josie
 Kevin Santos as Gerard
 Isabel Granada as Rica
 Charlie Davao as Ignacio

Ratings
According to AGB Nielsen Philippines' Mega Manila household television ratings, the pilot episode of Pasan Ko ang Daigdig earned a 19.8% rating. While the final episode scored a 20.7% rating.

References

External links
 

2007 Philippine television series debuts
2008 Philippine television series endings
Filipino-language television shows
GMA Network drama series
Live action television shows based on films
Television shows set in the Philippines